Lac-Ernest is an unorganized territory in the Laurentides region of Quebec, Canada. It is almost entirely within the Papineau-Labelle Wildlife Reserve.

History
In the early 1920s, the Singer Company, manufacturer best known for its sewing machines, began logging the area. This company built a railway from Thurso to southern Lake Montjoie in Lac-Ernest territory. Here a vast logging camp, known as "Camp 27", was established where logs were accumulated as far as the eye could see. In 1964, the MacLaren Company succeeded Singer and used the railroad until 1980 when it was dismantled and now functions as a rail trail.

Demographics
Population trend:
 Population in 2011: 0
 Population in 2006: 0
 Population in 2001: 0
 Population in 1996: 0
 Population in 1991: 0

See also
 List of unorganized territories in Quebec

References

Unorganized territories in Laurentides